Jean-Marie Borringes (2 December 1866 – 6 April 1920) was a French fencer. He competed in the men's masters foil event at the 1900 Summer Olympics.

References

External links
 

1866 births
1920 deaths
French male foil fencers
Olympic fencers of France
Fencers at the 1900 Summer Olympics
Sportspeople from Haute-Savoie